The men's 20 kilometres road run event at the 1994 World Junior Championships in Athletics was held in Lisbon, Portugal, on 24 July.

Medalists

Results

Final
24 July

Participation
According to an unofficial count, 16 athletes from 11 countries participated in the event.

References

20 kilometres road run
Road running at the World Junior Championships in Athletics